JUNOS – Young liberal NEOS is the youth wing of Austrian liberal NEOS party, and a full member of liberal youth organizations International Federation of Liberal Youth and European Liberal Youth.

Founded in 1993 under the name Liberales StudentInnenforum (or LSF) as Liberal Forum's youth organization, they broke with the mother party in 2009. Under the new name JuLis – Young Liberals Austria, they competed as an independent liberal party in the 2009 European elections.

Ahead of the 2013 legislative election they teamed up with the new liberal NEOS party, with JuLis chairperson Nikolaus Scherak entering the Austrian parliament. In March 2014 they integrated with NEOS representing the party's youth wing.

History

Liberal Students' Forum (1993–2009)

Young Liberals (2009–2013)

At their 2009 congress, Liberal Students’ Forum disintegrated from Liberal Forum (LIF) and turned into an independent youth organization under the new name Young Liberals. Ahead of the European elections 2009 in Austria, they, rather than LIF, received support and the required signature by Austrian MEP Karin Resetarits, who stated that the program of the Young Liberals was better. While this allowed the liberal youth party mostly consisting of members under 25 to compete in the elections with an independent list, it also deepened the rift with former mother party LIF and caused significant uproar in Austrian media. After having garnered 0.7% or 20.668 votes with almost no support and no classic advertisements, the Young Liberals Austria announced that they would concentrate their efforts on student politics for the time being.

Due to formal reasons, the JuLis were not able to compete in the elections to the Austrian Students' Association in 2009 and were subsequently not represented in the period 2009-2011.

During their III. Federal Congress in October 2010, the JuLis presented the "liberal manifesto for tertiary education" and announced their candidature for the ÖH-elections 2011. Out of several dozen contestants, the JuLis were the only ones in favour of a system of deferred tuition fees, citing the inadequate studying conditions and extremely high dropout quotes in Austria’s public universities, which have a longstanding tradition of free and unrestricted education for everyone holding the matura. Nevertheless, the JuLis were able to secure three seats in the federal assembly of the ÖH and parts of the new program of the Austrian minister of science Karlheinz Töchterle resembled very closely to what the JuLis had proposed several months earlier.

Despite the JuLis having a “complete party manifesto”, the Austrian media used to cite them as the potential youth wing of a yet-to-be-founded new liberal party in Austria. This happened in October 2012, when the JuLis participated in the foundation of NEOS – The New Austria as youth partners and Nikolaus Scherak was elected into the board of NEOS.

JUNOS (since 2013)

National board 
The current national board was elected at the XXI. Federal Congress, which took place on November 2, 2019 in Vienna:

Anna Stürgkh (President)
 Paul Pfahnl (Vice-President)
 Julia Deutsch (Secretary General)
 Bastian de Monte (International Officer)
 Clemens Ableidinger (Member of Board, Policy)
 Elma Jusic (Member of Board, Organizational Development)
 Jan Ritter (Member of Board, Communication)
 Florian Parfuss (Member of Board, Marketing)
 Stef Slager (President JUNOS Students)

Political values 
The JuLis see themselves as the only supporters of liberalism amongst Austria’s youth parties. According to their manifesto, their core values are freedom and responsibility, unity and diversity, rationality and progress, open-mindedness and tolerance, solidarity and a federal Europe.

Structure 
Since their foundation in 2009, the Young Liberals Austria are organised in federal groups that correspond to the nine federal states of Austria. As of January 2012, the JuLis have active groups in Vienna, Lower Austria, Upper Austria, Salzburg, Tyrol, Vorarlberg, Styria and Carinthia, covering all states except for Burgenland.

External links

References 

Organizations established in 1993
Youth wings of political parties in Austria
Political parties established in 2009
NEOS – The New Austria and Liberal Forum
1993 establishments in Austria
2009 establishments in Austria